EPCR may refer to:

 Endothelial protein C receptor, a protein encoded by the PROCR gene
 ePCR (electronic polymerase chain reaction), or in silico PCR, use of software tools to calculate PCR results
 European Professional Club Rugby, organises rugby union club championships